Amita is a female name of Indian, Hebrew and Italian origin. The name means "infinite, boundless" in Sanskrit, and "truth" in Hebrew.

List of people with the given name Amita
 Amita Bhushan (born 1970), Indian politician
 Amita Dhiri (born 1966), English actress
 Amita Kanekar (born 1965), Indian writer
 Amita Malik (1921-2009), Indian film critic
 Amita Sharma (born 1982), Indian cricketer
 Amita Suman (born 1997), British-Nepalese actress
 Amita, mother of Yasodharā
 Amita Young (born 1980), Thai singer, actress, and model.
 Amita Tiwari (born 1997)
 Amita Sharma (23 June 2001)
 Amita Shah(born 1955) worked in IPCL as quality control manager.Received National Award for a book Kashi Martand.Now at Ramanand Ashram. Guvar.Dist Narmada.Gujarat

Fictional characters
 Amita Ramanujan, fictional mathematician in the television series Numb3rs
 Amita, fictional character in the video game Far Cry 4

See also
 
 Amit (disambiguation), a male given name
 Anita (given name)
 Amy

References

Indian feminine given names
Hebrew feminine given names